The Job may refer to:

In film and television:
 The Job (2003 film), an action film starring Daryl Hannah
 The Job (2009 film), a dark comedy starring Patrick Flueger
 The Job, a 2005 short film featuring Marysia Kay
 The Job (2001 TV series), an American comedy-drama starring Denis Leary
 The Job (2013 TV series), a cancelled American reality competition show
 "The Job" (The Office), an episode of The Office (U.S.)
 The Job (2018 film), a short film starring Kalki Koechlin & produced by Kushal Srivastava

In literature:
 The Job (novel), a 1917 novel by Sinclair Lewis
 The Job (police newspaper), the official newspaper of London's Metropolitan Police Service
 The Job: Interviews with William S. Burroughs, a 1969 book by Daniel Odier 
 The Job, a 1998 novel by Douglas Kennedy

See also
 La Job, a Quebec adaptation of the British TV series The Office
 Job (disambiguation)